Bror-Christian Ilmoni (8 March 1918 in Pargas, Finland – 27 January 2008  in Helsinki, Finland) was a Finnish Olympic sailor in the Star class. He competed in the 1948 Summer Olympics, where he finished 12th together with René Nyman, and in the 1952 Summer Olympics where he finished 19th together with Nyman.

References

Olympic sailors of Finland
Finnish male sailors (sport)
Star class sailors
Sailors at the 1948 Summer Olympics – Star
Sailors at the 1952 Summer Olympics – Star
1918 births
2008 deaths
People from Pargas
Sportspeople from Southwest Finland